High Passage was a gaming magazine first published in 1981, written and produced by Christopher Kupczyk, Scott Walschlager, Jim Cunningham and Craig Johnson.

Contents
High Passage was a magazine approved for use with Traveller.

Publication history
High Passage was a digest-sized magazine created by Jim Cunningham's High Passage Group, and in August 1981 FASA came to an agreement to publish High Passage, after financial issues prevented further independent publication of the magazine. William H. Keith Jr. started providing art for the magazine, while Jordan Weisman and Ross Babcock did layout and editing; the first FASA issue was High Passage #2 (1981). After a falling out between FASA and the High Passage Group, High Passage #5 (1982) was edited by J. Andrew Keith, and just before High Passage #6 went to press the High Passage Group ended the two companies' partnership and told FASA that they could not publish additional High Passage material. FASA replaced High Passage with a new J. Andrew Keith magazine called Far Traveller, which began publication in October 1982.

Reception
William A. Barton reviewed the first issue of High Passage in The Space Gamer No. 40. Barton commented that "Although there is room for improvement in future issues, High Passage, based on its first issue, stands quite high among the many approved-for-Traveller items now on the market."

Reviews
Different Worlds #15 (Oct., 1981)
Different Worlds #18

References

Defunct magazines published in the United States
Hobby magazines published in the United States
Magazines established in 1981
Magazines disestablished in 1982
Role-playing game magazines
Traveller (role-playing game)